Neal Robert Pionk (born July 29, 1995) is an American professional ice hockey defenseman for  the Winnipeg Jets of the National Hockey League (NHL). An undrafted player, Pionk was signed by the New York Rangers as a college free agent from the University of Minnesota Duluth in 2017.

Early life
Pionk was born on July 29, 1995, in Omaha, Nebraska, to parents Karen and Scott Pionk. His father played baseball for Proctor High School and the University of Wisconsin–Superior before coaching ice hockey at the youth level and for the United States Hockey League (USHL). Pionk was raised in Hermantown, Minnesota, a suburb of Duluth, where his father built a baseball diamond and an ice hockey rink for Pionk and his friends to practice. All five Pionk brothers played baseball and ice hockey as children, and after school they would play two-on-two hockey in this backyard ice rink. In his adolescence, Pionk played with future National Hockey League (NHL) player Dylan Samberg on youth teams and for Hermantown High School. Pionk and his brothers also created an annual pick-up hockey tradition with fellow brothers Travis and Cole Koepke. They referred to this annual tournament as the Holiday Cup. In his final season for Hermantown, Pionk scored 14 goals and 29 points in 25 games.

The Sioux City Musketeers selected Pionk in the fifth round, 66th overall, of the 2012 USHL Draft. Immediately after taking Hermantown to a state championship title in 2013, Pionk left the school to begin his junior ice hockey career in Sioux City. He played 12 games for the Musketeers during their 2012–13 season, recording one goal and six points in the process. The next season, he recorded two goals and 23 points in 54 regular season games for the Musketeers. Sioux City advanced to the Western Conference Finals of the 2014 USHL championships, where they were swept by the Waterloo Black Hawks. Overlooked in the 2014 NHL Draft, Pionk served as captain of the Musketeers for the 2014–15 season. With seven goals and 41 assists in 53 regular season games, Pionk led all USHL defensemen in scoring, and he was named the USHL Defenseman of the Year at the end of the season. The Musketeers were eliminated by the Sioux Falls Stampede in a five-game Western Conference Semifinal series that postseason. In 119 career games for Sioux City, Pionk recorded 10 goals, 77 points, a +44 plus–minus rating, and 199 penalty minutes.

Playing career

College 
Pionk committed to play college ice hockey for the Minnesota Duluth Bulldogs in 2012, and he signed a National Letter of Intent in 2014 to join Duluth for their 2015–16 season. On October 24, 2015, Pionk scored the first goal of his collegiate career, the game-tying point in a 3–3 overtime draw against Notre Dame. After recording two points, two blocked shots, and a +2 rating in the two-game Notre Dame series, the National Collegiate Hockey Conference (NCHC) named Pionk their Defensive Player of the Week. Pionk received weekly honors again on March 7 after generating a team-high three points and four blocked shots in a two-game sweep of Miami University. Appearing in all 40 games for Duluth during his freshman season, Pionk recorded four goals and 17 points, and the Bulldogs named him the Jerry Chumola Rookie of the Year. At the end of the 2015–16 season, all Duluth freshmen, including Pionk, were named to the NCHC All-Academic Team.

After recording a goal and an assist in a two-game series against the UMass Lowell River Hawks, Pionk began the 2016–17 season as the NCHC Defenseman of the Week for the week ending October 10. He received the award again on December 12 after recording three points, six blocked shots, and a +2 rating against the Denver Pioneers. His third weekly honor of the season came on February 6, 2017, after a three-point weekend against Omaha. With seven goals and 28 points in the regular 2016–17 season, Pionk was named to both the All-NCHC Second Team and the All-USCHO Third Team as a sophomore. In the postseason, Pionk and the Bulldogs defeated the North Dakota Fighting Hawks 4–3 to capture the 2017 NCHC Tournament championship, their first conference championship since 2009. Pionk was one of four Duluth players named to the Frozen Faceoff All-Tournament Team that year. The Bulldogs then advanced to the 2017 NCAA Division I Men's Ice Hockey Tournament, where they fell 3–2 to Denver in the national championship. Pionk added another six points in eight postseason games, and he was named to the NCAA Division I Men's Ice Hockey All-Tournament Team.

After Duluth's loss to Denver in the NCAA tournament finals, Pionk announced that he would forfeit his final two seasons of college hockey eligibility in order to begin a professional career. He finished his career in Duluth with 11 goals, 51 points, and a +35 rating in 82 games.

Professional

New York Rangers 
On May 1, 2017, Pionk signed a two-year, $3.55 million contract with the New York Rangers of the NHL. After attending training camp with New York, Pionk was assigned to the Hartford Wolf Pack of the American Hockey League (AHL) to begin the 2017–18 season. He made his professional hockey debut on October 6, 2017, against the Charlotte Checkers, and recorded his first point two days later against the Lehigh Valley Phantoms. After recording one goal and 17 points in 48 games, Pionk was promoted to the Rangers on February 8, 2018. He made his NHL debut the next night, blocking three shots in a 4-3 victory over the Calgary Flames. Pionk scored his first NHL goal on March 24 against the Buffalo Sabres, the culmination of a stretch of 13 points in 12 games. Despite playing on a team that struggled defensively throughout the  season, Pionk finished his rookie year with 14 points in 28 games, and he received frequent playing time down the final stretch of the season.

Pionk joined the Rangers full-time during the 2018–19 season. He recorded six goals and 26 points in 73 games, leading all Rangers' defencemen with 13 power play points.

Winnipeg Jets 
On June 17, 2019, Pionk and a 2019 first-round pick were traded to the Winnipeg Jets in exchange for Jacob Trouba. The first-round pick originally belonged to the Jets. On July 21, the Jets signed Pionk to a two-year, $6 million contract extension.

On August 11, 2021, Pionk signed a four-year, $23.5 million contract with the Jets.

International play

As a citizen of the United States, Pionk has represented his home country at both the junior and senior levels. He first represented Team USA at the 2013 World Junior A Challenge where he helped them earn a gold medal and was named to the Tournament All-Star Team. Following this, Pionk never represented Team USA again until 2018, when he along with teammate Chris Kreider, were the only Rangers players selected to represent the United States at the 2018 IIHF World Championship. During the tournament, Pionk recorded three points through 10 games to win a bronze medal.

Career statistics

Regular season and playoffs

International

Awards and honours

References

External links
 

1995 births
Living people
American men's ice hockey defensemen
Hartford Wolf Pack players
Ice hockey players from Minnesota
Minnesota Duluth Bulldogs men's ice hockey players
New York Rangers players
People from Hermantown, Minnesota
Sioux City Musketeers players
Undrafted National Hockey League players
Winnipeg Jets players